Davis Aircraft Corporation  was an American aircraft manufacturer.

The Davis Aircraft Corporation was founded by Walter C. Davis after the sale of the Davis Automobile Company in 1928. The company was formed with the purchase and merger of the Vulcan Aircraft company, and Baltimore, Maryland based Doyle Aero Company securing the rights to the Vulcan American Moth parasol. The American Moth was modified by engineer Dwight Huntington, and certified as the Davis V-3 on 6 September 1929. Weeks later the Wall Street Crash of 1929 occurred. An updated Davis W-1 (ATC#256) was certified on 8 November 1929. Davis Aircraft ceased aircraft operations after a fire destroyed the manufacturing hangar and several aircraft at the height of the depression. Several aircraft were finished out of spare parts, but the company transitioned to making lawnmowers in 1932

Aircraft

References

External links

Defunct aircraft manufacturers of the United States
1929 establishments in Indiana
1930 disestablishments in Indiana
Vehicle manufacturing companies established in 1929